Aqdarreh-ye Vosta (also Romanized as Āqdarreh-ye Vosţá; also known as Āgh Darreh-ye Vosţá) is a village in Ahmadabad Rural District, Takht-e Soleyman District, Takab County, West Azerbaijan Province, Iran. At the 2006 census, its population was 350, in 67 families.

References 

Populated places in Takab County